Kamal Kishor  is an Indian politician and a former Member of Parliament of India. He was a member of the 15th Lok Sabha. Kishor represents the Bahraich constituency of Uttar Pradesh and is a member of the Indian National Congress political party.

Early life and education
Kishor was born in the village Rajdhani, Gorakhpur in the state of Uttar Pradesh, Dhobi family. After joining the Indian Armed Forces, he completed his graduation (B.A) from Indian Armed Forces Institution. Kishor served in the Indian Armed Forces before joining politics. Post his army service, he was worked as a businessperson and agriculturist.

Political career
Kishor has been in active politics since early 2000s and joined Indian National Congress party. He is a first time M.P and is also a member of several committees. Kishor succeeded Rubab Sayda of Samajwadi Party from the Lok Sabha constituency.

Posts held

See also

15th Lok Sabha
Lok Sabha
Politics of India
Parliament of India
Government of India
Indian National Congress
Bahraich (Lok Sabha constituency)

References 

India MPs 2009–2014
1956 births
Indian Muslims
Indian National Congress politicians
Lok Sabha members from Uttar Pradesh
People from Gorakhpur
People from Gorakhpur district
Living people
United Progressive Alliance candidates in the 2014 Indian general election
People from Bahraich district